Aframomum flavum is a species in the ginger family, Zingiberaceae. It was first described by John Michael Lock.

References 

flavum